Petr Samoylenko (born February 7, 1977) is a retired Russian professional basketball player. At a height of 6 ft 1  in (1.87 m) tall, and a weight of 190 pounds (86 kg), he played at the point guard position. He was best known throughout his career for being a defensive specialist.

Professional career
Samoylenko played professionally with Samara, UNICS Kazan, Dynamo Moscow, and Spartak Primorye.

Russian national team
Samoylenko was a long-time member of the senior Russian national basketball team. With Russia's senior national team, he played at the following tournaments: the EuroBasket 2001, the EuroBasket 2003, the EuroBasket 2005, the EuroBasket 2007, and the 2008 Summer Olympic Games.

Club honors
 North European League
Winner (1): 2002–03
FIBA Europe League
Winner (1): 2003–04
 VTB League
Runner-up (2): 2009–10, 2011–12
 EuroCup
Winner (1): 2010–11
 Russian League
Runner-up (4): 2000–01, 2001–02, 2003–04, 2006–07
Third place (9): 1996–97, 1997–98, 1999–00, 2002–03, 2004–05, 2007–08, 2008–09, 2009–10, 2010–11
 Russian Cup
Winner (2): 2003, 2009
Runner-up (3): 2005, 2007, 2010

References

External links
Euroleague.net Profile
FIBA Archive Profile
FIBA Europe Profile
Eurobasket.com Profile

1977 births
Living people
Basketball players at the 2008 Summer Olympics
BC Dynamo Moscow players
BC Samara players
BC Spartak Primorye players
BC UNICS players
FIBA EuroBasket-winning players
Olympic basketball players of Russia
Point guards
Russian men's basketball players